Giles Jackson (born December 11, 2001) is an American football wide receiver and kickoff return specialist for the Washington Huskies of the Pac-12 Conference. He previously played two seasons for the Michigan Wolverines.

Early years
Jackson grew up in Antioch, California, and attended Freedom High School. As a junior in 2017, he totaled 1,586 rushing yards and 22 touchdowns on 221 carries and caught 21 passes for 324 yards and five touchdowns. He committed to the University of Michigan in September 2018. After committing to Michigan, he had a strong senior season with 63 receptions for 1,254 yards and 13 touchdowns, 38 rushing carries for 207 yards, and a 65-yard punt return for touchdown.

University of Michigan

Freshman season
As a 17-year-old freshman in 2019, he played at wide receiver and kick returner and appeared in all 13 games. He became the second freshman in Michigan history (after Gil Chapman) to score touchdowns on kick return, pass reception, and rushing. In the 2020 Citrus Bowl, he caught four passes for 57 yards, including a 40-yard gainer, against Alabama.

On special teams, Jackson returned 24 kickoffs for 622 yards (25.9 yards per return), including a 97-yard return for touchdown in the opening play against Maryland. On offense, he totaled 19 touches for 211 yards in 2019. After Jackson's freshman year, he received honorable mention All-Big Ten honors. Michigan coach Jim Harbaugh said: "We love Giles back there; I think everybody does. He's crazy fast, super talented."

Sophomore season
During the 2019 season, Jackson wore jersey no. 15. In February 2020, after the NCAA announced that players would be permitted to wear jersey no. 0, Jackson asked for the number. His request was granted, and Jackson in 2020 became the first Michigan football player to wear the number. With the departure of receivers Donovan Peoples-Jones, Tarik Black, and Nico Collins, Jackson was expected to player a larger role in Michigan's offense during the 2020 season.

On November 21, 2020, in a triple-overtime victory over Rutgers, Jackson returned the opening kickoff of the second half 94 yards for a touchdown. He also drew a pass interference penalty that set up the game-winning touchdown in the third overtime period.

Jackson ended the season with 15 catches for 167 yards, and returned 18 kickoffs for 399 yards and a touchdown.

On March 29, 2021, Jackson announced his intentions to transfer from Michigan.

College statistics

References

External links
 Washington profile
 Michigan profile

2001 births
Living people
American football wide receivers
Michigan Wolverines football players
Washington Huskies football players
People from Antioch, California
Sportspeople from the San Francisco Bay Area
Players of American football from California
African-American players of American football
21st-century African-American sportspeople